"Lluvia Cae" ("Rain is Falling") is the title of the fifth single released by Spanish singer-songwriter Enrique Iglesias from his second studio album, Vivir (1997), It was released on 13 October 1997 (see 1997 in music).

Song information
The track was written and produced by Rafael Pérez-Botija, and co-written by Enrique Iglesias, and became the second single in a row not to peak at number one in the Billboard Hot Latin Tracks, after "Revolución" reached only number six.

Chart performance
The track debuted on the United States Billboard Hot Latin Tracks chart at number 29 on 20 December 1997 and peaked at number 3 on 7 February 1998 for two weeks. The single was blocked from the top spot, in the first week by "En El Jardín" by Alejandro Fernández featuring Gloria Estefan (#1) and "Contigo (Estar Contigo)" by Luis Miguel (#2), and in the second week by "Por Qué Te Conocí" by Los Temerarios (#1) and "En El Jardín" (#2).

References

1997 singles
1997 songs
Enrique Iglesias songs
Spanish-language songs
Songs written by Rafael Pérez-Botija
Songs written by Enrique Iglesias
Fonovisa Records singles